Xiao Ruoteng (born 30 January 1996) is a Chinese artistic gymnast.

Personal life 
Xiao was born 30 January 1996 in Beijing, China. He began gymnastics at age five.

Xiao has received four awards. The General Administration of Sport of China named him an Elite Athlete of National Class in 2012 and 2016. In 2018, the Xinhua News Agency named him one of the Top 10 Athletes of the Year in the People's Republic of China. In 2020, he received the Beijing May 4th Youth Medal.

He studied physical education at Beijing Sport University and speaks Mandarin and English.

Career

2015 
Xiao competed in the World Championships in Glasgow, Great Britain, where his team placed third.

2016 
Xiao injured his elbow during training, and was unable to compete in the 2016 Olympic Games in Rio de Janeiro, Brazil.

2017 
In May 2017, Xiao competed at the Asian Championships in Bangkok, Thailand, where his team won gold. He won first all around and on parallel bars, as well as second on floor and high bar. He became the first gymnast in nine years, other than Kohei Uchimura, to win a major all-around title after returning from an injury. He shared the podium with teammate and silver medalist Lin Chaopan.

In October, Xiao competed at the World Championships in Montreal, Canada, where he placed first all around, as well as third on pommel horse.

2018 
In August, Xiao competed at the Asian Games in Indonesia, where his team won first. Xiao placed third all around, as well as third on high bar and second on parallel bars.

In October, Xiao competed at the World Championships in Doha, Qatar, where the team placed first. Xiao placed second all around, as well as first on pommel horse.

2019 
Xiao competed at the World Championships in Stuttgart, Germany, where his team placed second. He placed fourth all around and on parallel bars, as well as third on floor exercise.

2021 
At the 2020 Summer Olympics in Tokyo, Japan, Xiao competed for the People's Republic of China, a team including Sun Wei, Zou Jingyuan, and Lin Chaopan. The team won Olympic bronze with a combined score of 262.397, 0.606 points beneath the winning team.

References

External links 
 

1996 births
Living people
Chinese male artistic gymnasts
Medalists at the World Artistic Gymnastics Championships
Gymnasts at the 2018 Asian Games
Medalists at the 2018 Asian Games
Asian Games gold medalists for China
Asian Games silver medalists for China
Asian Games bronze medalists for China
Asian Games medalists in gymnastics
Gymnasts from Beijing
Olympic gymnasts of China
Gymnasts at the 2020 Summer Olympics
Medalists at the 2020 Summer Olympics
Olympic medalists in gymnastics
Olympic silver medalists for China
Olympic bronze medalists for China
21st-century Chinese people